The 2015–16 South Carolina Gamecocks women's basketball team represents the University of South Carolina during the 2015–16 NCAA Division I women's basketball season. The Gamecocks, led by eighth year head coach Dawn Staley, play their home games at the Colonial Life Arena and were members of the Southeastern Conference. They finished the season 33–2, 16–0 in SEC play to win the SEC regular season and the tournament championship to earn an automatic bid to the NCAA women's tournament. They defeated Jacksonville and Kansas State in the first and second rounds before getting upset by Syracuse in the sweet sixteen.

Roster

Schedule

|-
!colspan=9 style="background:#73000A; color:#FFFFFF;" | Exhibition

|-
!colspan=9 style="background:#73000A; color:#FFFFFF;"| Regular season

|-
!colspan=9 style="background:#73000A; color:#FFFFFF;" | SEC Women's Tournament

|-
!colspan=9 style="background:#73000A; color:#FFFFFF;" | NCAA Women's Tournament

Rankings

See also
2015–16 South Carolina Gamecocks men's basketball team

References

South Carolina Gamecocks women's basketball seasons
South Carolina
South Carolina